The Bayard Bridge is a crossing of the North Branch Potomac River between Grant County, West Virginia and Garrett County, Maryland.  The bridge takes its name from the town of Bayard at its West Virginia end.

History
According to West Virginia Division of Highways records, Bayard Bridge was built prior to 1900.  The through truss span became limited by its narrow  width, and the state decided to close this span along with ones at Dobbin and Henry in 1988.

Replacement span
Since its closing, local citizens and businesses on both sides of the bridge have pushed for the construction of a replacement span at various times.  As of 2008, there is a current campaign to acquire a new bridge.

See also
List of crossings of the Potomac River

References

Road bridges in Maryland
Transportation buildings and structures in Garrett County, Maryland
Buildings and structures in Grant County, West Virginia
Transportation in Grant County, West Virginia
Road bridges in West Virginia
Steel bridges in the United States